Pantaleon was an early 2nd century BC Greco-Bactrian king.

Pantaleon may also refer to:

 Pantaleon of Pydna (4th century BC), Macedonian officer under Alexander the Great
 Pantaleon of Pleuron (3rd century BC), Aetolian general
 Saint Pantaleon (died 303), Christian martyr
 Saint-Pantaléon, Lot, a former commune in the Lot department in France
 Saint-Pantaléon, Vaucluse, a commune in the Vaucluse department in France
 Saint-Pantaléon-de-Lapleau, a commune in the Corrèze department in France
 Saint-Pantaléon-de-Larche, a commune the Corrèze department in France
 Saint-Pantaléon-les-Vignes, a commune the Drôme department in France
 Jacques Pantaléon (1195–1264), Patriarch of Jerusalem, later Pope Urban IV
 Pantalon, musical instrument, a variation of the hammered dulcimer
 Pantaleon y las visitadoras, is a film based on the eponymous comic novel by Peruvian Mario Vargas Llosa (2010 Nobel Prize in Literature)

See also
 Panteley (disambiguation) for names, places or churches named Panteley or Panteleimon